Yordanov Nunatak (‘Yordanov Nunatak’ \yor-da-'nov 'nu-na-tak\) is the rocky ridge 5 km long and 2.6 km wide, with twin heights rising to 876 m (central one) and 885 m (western one) on the coast of Borima Bay, between Jorum Glacier and Minzuhar Glacier on Oscar II Coast, Graham Land in Antarctica.

The feature is named after Yordan Yordanov, engineer at St. Kliment Ohridski base in 2001/02 and base commander in subsequent seasons.

Location
British mapping in 1974.

Maps
 Antarctic Digital Database (ADD). Scale 1:250000 topographic map of Antarctica. Scientific Committee on Antarctic Research (SCAR), 1993–2016.

Notes

References
 Yordanov Nunatak. SCAR Composite Antarctic Gazetteer.
 Bulgarian Antarctic Gazetteer. Antarctic Place-names Commission. (details in Bulgarian, basic data in English)

External links
 Yordanov Nunatak. Copernix satellite image

Nunataks of Graham Land
Oscar II Coast
Bulgaria and the Antarctic